Erkki Tapani "Eki" Heinonen  (born 8 July 1967) is a sailor from Vaasa, Finland, who represented his country at the 2000 Summer Olympics in Sydney, Australia as crew member in the Soling. With helmsman Jali Mäkilä and fellow crew member Sami Tamminen they took the 15th place.

In 2019 Heinonen became Soling European Championship with crew members Gabor Helmhout and his son Mathias Heinonen in Torbole, Italy.

References

Living people
1967 births
European Champions Soling
Sailors at the 2000 Summer Olympics – Soling
Olympic sailors of Finland
Sportspeople from Vaasa
Finnish male sailors (sport)